Mei Foo Central, formerly called Lai Wan, is one of the 25 constituencies in the Sham Shui Po District of Hong Kong.

The constituency returns one district councillor to the Sham Shui Po District Council, with an election every four years. The seat is currently held by independent Ng Yuet-lan, who was previously part of the Civic Party.

Mei Foo Central constituency is loosely based on the middle part of the Mei Foo Sun Chuen in Lai Chi Kok and has an estimated population of 12,720.

Councillors represented

Election results

2010s

2000s

References

Lai Chi Kok
Constituencies of Hong Kong
Constituencies of Sham Shui Po District Council
2003 establishments in Hong Kong
Constituencies established in 2003